Cnidoscolus quercifolius (syn. C. phyllacanthus; common names in Portuguese:  favela, faveleira, faveleiro, and mandioca-brava) is a species of flowering plant.  It is endemic to Brazil. Its distributional range includes Bahia, Pernambuco, Piaui and São Paulo. Its common name is the source of the term "favela" for a type of low-income informal settlement in Brazil.

References

External links
Sorting Cnidoscolus names

quercifolius
Flora of Brazil